Never+Land (stylized as never+land) is the debut studio album by the former vocalist of day after tomorrow, Koda Misono, under the stage name "misono." The album was released on February 28, 2007 following the released of five singles, and charted at No. 20 on the Oricon weekly charts.

Information
never+land is the debut studio album of Japanese singer-songwriter misono. It was her first album since the disbandment of day after tomorrow, of which misono was the lead vocalist. The album debuted high on the Oricon Albums Charts, coming it at #8; however, the album dropped in rank throughout the week, giving the album the weekly ranking of No. 20. It stayed on the charts for three consecutive weeks.

Staying true to the title, never+land was an album centered around a fairy tale theme, with many of the songs' being homages to various famous fairy tales. The album's title and artwork was a take on Neverland from the tale of Peter Pan, most notably from the 1953 film of the same name released by The Walt Disney Company. Many of the adaptations were in reference to Disney's films. Her first single for the album, "VS," was centered around the fairy tale of Snow White, with misono playing both the character Snow White and the evil queen. Throughout the song, the evil queen would set traps, which Snow White would find and turn against her. Her second song, "Kojin Jugyō," was a take on Cinderella, with misono being shown to have affection for a classmate, who doesn't appear to notice her. In the song, a small fairy comes to transform her, which gains the attention of her crush; but, as with the fairy tale, her transformation disappears after midnight. Her sister, Koda Kumi, would later take inspiration from this video for her song "Koi no Tsubomi."

For "Speedrive," misono performed a take on The Ugly Duckling. For the video, she used a green screen and, as the Ugly Duckling, would constantly fall into misfortune. While the song "Hot Time" was omitted on the CD, the other a-side, "A.__~answer~," was used. The song was inspired by Peter Pan and performs a take with Peter coming back to visit Wendy, who has grown old and frail and can no longer play as they did when they were children. "Hot Time," however, was a take on The Little Match Girl. For the album, only the scene where misono was thrown outside of her home by her father was used.

For track No. 10, "Five Finger Medley," misono covered an array of songs from the 1970s group Finger 5: "Kojin Jugyo," "Koi no Dial 6700," "Gakuen Tengoku" and "Koi no Daiyogen." Of the new material on the album, only the track "Suna no Shiro no Mermaid ~Riku to Umi no Sekai~" (砂の城のマーメイド～陸と海の世界～ / Sandcastle Mermaid ~World of Land and Sea~) harbored a music video. This song was also used as the main promotional single to help promote the album.

The album had drawn criticism due to it carrying little new material, with the album being predominately previous a-sides and b-sides of the previous singles, and only four new songs being released.

Packaging
never+land was released in three editions: CD, CD+DVD and a CD+Photobook combo.

Both the CD and CD+DVD editions contained the same material on the CD portion. Despite the album having five singles prior to its release, only one of the videos made it to the DVD: "A.__~answer~." Instead of the Girls meet Beauty version that was used on the single, the version contained the story of Peter Pan, in which he returns to visit Wendy, who has grown old and frail and can no longer see him, despite him coming to visit her. As a bonus track, an alternate version of "Hot Time" was placed on the album. Instead of the music video carrying the full story of The Little Match Girl, the version on the album was when the girl was thrown outside in the mud by her father to sell the matches.

The DVD did contain one new music video: "Suna no Shiro no Mermaid ~Riku to Umi no Sekai~." To keep in tune with the fairy tale theme of the album, the video was centered around the fairy tale of The Little Mermaid.

For the CD+Photobook edition, the photo book contained every promotional image of misono from her time in the band day after tomorrow until the release of her solo album.

Track listing

Charts

Album

Singles

References

External links
misono Official
misono Profile Oricon Style

2007 debut albums
Avex Group albums
2007 video albums
Songs written by Misono